The Radical Liberal Party, abbreviated to PRL, was a Luxembourgian political party that existed from 1932 until 1945.  It was the main party bridging the gap between the former Liberal League and the current Democratic Party.

The party was founded in 1932 through a merger of the Radical Socialist Party (PRS) and the Radical Party (PR).  The PRS had been the main group to emerge from the collapse of the Liberal League, whilst the Radical Party had broken away from the PRS in 1928.  The two, however, continued to cooperate, and were reunited fully by the created of the Radical Liberal Party in 1932.  In their first election, the partial elections held in 1934, the party won 3 seats in the 54-seat Chamber of Deputies.  This was increased to five out of 55 in 1937.  This would be the last election that the party would fight.

The PRL was a part of the Luxembourgian government from 1932 until 1938, as the junior partner to the Party of the Right, which dominated inter-war politics.  The PRL continued to exist until the political realignment brought about by the German occupation during Second World War.  On 2 June 1945, the party was reconstituted as the Patriotic and Democratic Group, which would become the Democratic Party.

Leading members of the party included Nicolas Braunshausen, Gaston Diderich, Norbert Dumont, Étienne Schmit.  Diderich was the Mayor of Luxembourg City for the duration of the party's existence, whilst the other three all held cabinet positions.

See also
 Liberalism in Luxembourg

Liberal parties in Luxembourg
Defunct political parties in Luxembourg
Defunct liberal political parties
Political parties established in 1932
Political parties disestablished in 1945
Radical parties